Daryn Okada, A.S.C. (born January 2, 1960) is a cinematographer and the former president of the American Society of Cinematographers. In 2015, Okada joined the board of governors of the Academy of Motion Picture Arts and Sciences. A highly prolific director of photography, Okada has worked on numerous well-known films including Halloween H20: 20 Years Later, Lake Placid, Mean Girls, and American Reunion, many of which are directed by Steve Miner.

Filmography

Film 
 Nomad Riders (1984)
 Monaco Forever (1984)
 Phantasm II (1988)
 Survival Quest (1988)
 Blind Curve (1988)
 Punk Vacation (1990)
 Wild Hearts Can't Be Broken (1991)
 Captain Ron (1992)
 Airborne (1993)
 My Father the Hero (1994)
 Big Bully (1996)
 Black Sheep (1996)
 Anna Karenina (1997)
 Senseless (1998)
 Halloween H20: 20 Years Later (1998)
 Lake Placid (1999)
 Bring It On (2000)
 Texas Rangers (2001)
 Dr. Dolittle 2 (2001)
 Good Advice (2001)
 Joe Somebody (2001)
 Cradle 2 the Grave (2003)
 Mean Girls (2004)
 Paparazzi (2004)
 Just Like Heaven (2005)
 Stick It (2006)
 Sex and Death 101 (2007)
 Baby Mama (2008)
 Harold and Kumar Escape from Guantanamo Bay (2008)
 Ghosts of Girlfriends Past (2009)
 The Goods: Live Hard, Sell Hard (2009)
 American Reunion (2012)
 Movie 43 (2013) ("The Proposition" segment)
 Let's Be Cops (2014)
 Dolphin Tale 2 (2014)

Other credits

 Phantasm (1979) (grip)
 Falling in Love Again (1980) (additional photographer) / (key grip)
 Fear No Evil (1981) (post-production supervisor)
 Workout (1982) (gaffer)
 The Beastmaster (1982) (Steadicam operator - uncredited) / (co-director of photography: second unit - uncredited)
 Runaway Nightmare (1982) (key grip)
 Frightmare (1983) (key grip)
 Ladies Night (1983) (camera operator)
 Microwave Massacre (1983) (key grip)
 Stitches (1985) (director of photography: second unit)
 Lady in White (1988) (camera operator: second unit)
 The Man Without a Face (1993) (additional photographer - uncredited)
 Immortal Beloved (1994) (additional photographer - uncredited)
 The X-Files (1998) (additional photographer)
 Payback (1999) (additional photographer - uncredited)
 Win a Date with Tad Hamilton! (2004) (director of photography: second unit)
 Apocalypto (2006) (director of photography: UK)

Television 
 Kidd Video (1984) - 1 episode
 Elvis (1990) - 13 episodes
 Blind Vengeance (1990) - Television film
 In a Child's Name (1991) - 2 episodes
 Boris and Natasha: The Movie (1992) - Television film
 Eyes of Terror (1994) - Television film
 Separated by Murder (1994) - Television film
 A Mother's Instinct (1996) - Television film
 Vanishing Point (1997) - Television film
 Dawson's Creek (1998) - 1 episode
 Wasteland (1999) - 1 episode
 Eva Adams (2009) - Television film
 Castle (2010-2015) - 24 episodes
 Switched at Birth (2011) - 1 episode
 Made in Jersey (2012) - 6 episodes
 Franklin & Bash (2013) - 7 episodes
 Scandal (2015-2016) - 7 episodes
 Grey's Anatomy (2017) - 2 episodes
 Station 19 (2018) - 2 episodes

Director
 Scandal (2018) - 1 episode
 Station 19 (2019-22) - 3 episodes

Other credits

 Runamuk (1978) - Television film (bestboy)

References

External links

1960 births
Living people
American cinematographers
American people of Japanese descent
People from Montebello, California